Sebastián Andrés Pérez Kirby (born 2 December 1990) is a Chilean footballer who currently plays as a goalkeeper for Chilean club Unión Española on loan from Universidad Católica.

Club career
Pérez made his professional debut playing for Everton de Viña del Mar in a Primera División match against Cobreloa by replacing Gustavo Dalsasso. Later, he was loaned to Tercera A club Deportes Melipilla and twice to Deportes Puerto Montt at the Primera B and Segunda División. After having no chances to play for Everton, on 2018 season he joined Palestino.

On 2019 season, he joined Deportes Iquique.

International career
Pérez made his debut for the Chile national team on 9 December 2021 in a 2–2 draw against Mexico.

Personal life
He is nicknamed Zanahoria (Carrot) due to the color of his hair.

From his maternal line, Pérez is of Irish descent.

Career statistics

Club

International

Honours

Club
Deportes Puerto Montt
 Segunda División: 2014-15

Palestino
 Copa Chile: 2018

Universidad Católica
 Chilean Primera División: 2021
 Supercopa de Chile: 2020, 2021

References

External links
 

Living people
1990 births
Chilean people of Irish descent
People from Viña del Mar
Sportspeople from Viña del Mar
Chilean footballers
Chile international footballers
Everton de Viña del Mar footballers
Deportes Melipilla footballers
Puerto Montt footballers
Club Deportivo Palestino footballers
Deportes Iquique footballers
Club Deportivo Universidad Católica footballers
Tercera División de Chile players
Chilean Primera División players
Primera B de Chile players
Segunda División Profesional de Chile players
Association football goalkeepers